The Nieuwezijds Voorburgwal is a street in the centre of Amsterdam. The street runs north-south without intersecting major streets other than the intersection with Raadhuisstraat at its halfway point, right behind the Royal Palace. On the eastern side it has a number of alleys connecting to Kalverstraat and Nieuwendijk.

Name 
The street name means 'New Side Front Bastion Wall'. In the 14th century, the city of Amsterdam was equally divided in two parts, each at one side of the River Amstel. To defend the city against intruders, a canal with a bastion wall was built. The  protecting the oldest of the two sides was called the Old Side Bastion Wall. The bastion wall at the new side was called the New Side Bastion Wall. When in 1385 a new bastion wall was built with a canal—behind the old bastion walls—those were now called New Side Behind Bastion Wall and Old Side Behind Bastion Wall. The original bastion walls were then renamed as New Side Front Bastion Wall and Old Side Front Bastion Wall.

Traffic 
Where the canal used to flow tram tracks were laid after the filling in.  is now one of two main axes carrying trams towards Central Station. It used to also be a major route for regional buses before the city decided to the decrease the number of buses running through the historic city centre. In the 1996 the southern part from Roskamsteeg to Spui was converted to one-way traffic in the northward direction for private motor vehicles. The new traffic plan made a large-scale renovation of the street possible where more space was dedicated to cycling and pedestrian infrastructure and greenery rather than on-street parking and several lanes of motor traffic.

Notable locations 
Halfway along the southern part of  the street curves westwards. At that location the buildings on both sides of the streets are slightly recessed, creating a somewhat larger space, formerly used as a parking lot and colloquially called  (Post Stamp Market), named after collector markets that used to be held here.

 contains a number of notable buildings, including the Royal Palace of Amsterdam, the Nieuwe Kerk, the Amsterdam Museum and the former main post office which is now the Magna Plaza. Across from the royal palace on the corner with  W Hotel can be found housed in a 1930s telegraphy building. Dutch psychiatrist Tina Strobos, who rescued over 100 Jewish refugees from the Holocaust during World War II, lived with her family at  282.

Gallery

References

Streets in Amsterdam
Former canals in Amsterdam